The 2017–18 Wisconsin Badgers men's basketball team represented the University of Wisconsin–Madison in the 2017–18 NCAA Division I men's basketball season. The Badgers were led by third-year head coach Greg Gard and played their home games at the Kohl Center as members of the Big Ten Conference. They finished the season 15–18, 7–11 in Big Ten play to finish in ninth place. They defeated Maryland in the second round of the Big Ten tournament before losing to Michigan State in the quarterfinals. The Badgers failed to make the NCAA tournament for the first time since 1998, ending their streak at 19 years.

Previous season
The Badgers finished the 2016–17 season 27–10, 12–6 in Big Ten play to finish in a tie for second place. They defeated Indiana and Northwestern in the Big Ten tournament, but lost to Michigan in the championship game. They received an at-large bid to the NCAA tournament, their 19th consecutive trip to the NCAA Tournament, as a No. 8 seed in the East region. The Badgers defeated Virginia Tech in the First Round and upset No. 1 overall seed Villanova to advance to the Sweet Sixteen for the fourth consecutive year. In the Sweet Sixteen, they lost to 20th-ranked Florida.

Offseason

Departures

Recruiting classes

2017 recruiting class

2018 recruiting class

New Zealand/Australia trip 
The Badgers undertook trip to New Zealand and Australia where they played five games against New Zealand and Australia professional teams. The 12-day trip began August 12, 2017 and helped determine the roster as the Badgers look to replace four departing seniors from last year. The Badgers won four of the five games they played on the trip. A different player led Wisconsin in scoring in each of the games and none of them was first-team All-Big Ten forward Ethan Happ, who did average 12.0 points, 6.4 rebounds, 3.4 assists and 2.4 steals. Coach Greg Gard was impressed by the balanced scoring of his team on the trip.

Preseason 
Wisconsin junior forward Ethan Happ was selected as a first team All-American by the Blue Ribbon Yearbook in its annual preseason publication.

Roster

Schedule and results

|-
!colspan=12 style=| Australia/New Zealand exhibition trip

|-
!colspan=12 style=|Exhibition

|-
!colspan=12 style=|Regular season

|-
!colspan=9 style=|Big Ten tournament

Player statistics
Updated through February 16, 2018

References

Wisconsin Badgers men's basketball seasons
Wisconsin
Badgers men's basketball team
Badgers men's basketball team